The Literacy & Non-Formal Basic Education Department is a department of Government of Punjab, Pakistan. It was created in 2002 to address the problem of dropouts at the primary level and meet the emerging demand for non-formal basic education with functional literacy and livelihood skills. The department is working in collaboration with Japan International Cooperation Agency (JICA) and United Nations International Children's Emergency Fund (UNICEF).

See also 
 School education department (Punjab, Pakistan)
 Special education department (Punjab, Pakistan)
 Higher education department (Punjab, Pakistan)
 Education in Pakistan
 Ministry of Federal Education and Professional Training

References

Departments of Government of Punjab, Pakistan
Education in Punjab, Pakistan
Punjab, Pakistan